Dwi Chandra Rukmana (born 21 August 1997) is an Indonesian footballer who currently plays as a striker for PSMS Medan.

Career

PSIS Semarang
He first played professionally for PSIS Semarang in June 2016.

References

1997 births
Living people
Indonesian footballers
People from Semarang
Association football forwards
PSIS Semarang players
Sportspeople from Central Java